Villanueva del Conde is a village and municipality in the province of Salamanca,  western Spain, part of the autonomous community of Castile-Leon. It is located 78 kilometres from the provincial capital city of Salamanca and has a population of 251 people.

Geography
The municipality covers an area of 13 km².  It lies 801 metres above sea level and the postal code is 37658.

See also
List of municipalities in Salamanca

References

Municipalities in the Province of Salamanca